Árpád Soós (born 20 April 1962) is a Swiss football manager.

References

1962 births
Living people
Swiss football managers
FC Lausanne-Sport managers
FC Stade Nyonnais managers